Swanlights is the fourth studio album by Antony and the Johnsons, released on October 12, 2010 worldwide through Secretly Canadian, and October 11, 2010 in the United Kingdom through Rough Trade. To accompany the album release, the band has produced a 144-page art book also titled Swanlights, which includes paintings, collages, photography and writing by Anohni.
The album was preceded by lead single/EP Thank You for Your Love, released on August 30, 2010 in the UK and 1 September in the US.

Artwork and book
The Swanlights project consists of music and artwork that Anohni has been focusing on for the last three years. Many of the songs that appear on the album had been recorded during tracking for The Crying Light while two of the tracks stem from live recordings in Copenhagen and London in 2008 and 2009. Anohni undertook a project to create a companion piece to the Swanlights album in the form of an art book in collaboration with Abrams Image Publishing, Garrick Gott and Joie Iacono, incorporating drawings, paintings, portraits and poems from a mass of work that was creating during recordings of "The Crying Light" and "Swanlights". In interviews, Anohni described her work on Swanlights as "a collision between joy and a sense of hopelessness". Anohni said she was struggling to come to terms with the idea that she was part of a society that was having a "virulent" impact on the earth.

In 2009, the New York Times wrote a feature on Anohni and her earliest exhibition of her work at the ISIS Gallery in London entitled The Creek. Artwork from Swanlights has subsequently been shown at the Agnes B Gallery in Paris, in Turin, and by curator Jerome Sans in the exhibition "It's Only Rock And Roll Baby" in Brussels and Milan.

Concert
One special event was performed in support of Swanlights at Lincoln Center in New York City on 30 October 2010 with the Orchestra of St. Luke's, conducted by Rob Moose, with a special screening as a backdrop of "Mr. O's Book of the Dead" by Chiaki Nagano. Anohni dedicated the evening to Kazuo Ohno who died in June of that year. Anohni said this about Kazuo's passing, "I want to express my sorrow at the passing of Kazuo Ohno, who died today in a hospital in Yokohama at the age of 103. He was my hero and my teacher. I feel so honored to have had the opportunity to meet him and get a little closer to his family and his work earlier this year when we visited the Kazuo Ohno Dance Studio in Japan. I thank him for awakening a sense of a child inside me. I will dream of him forever, and I will search for his footsteps in the dust of life before me. I wish only for his flourishing joy."

The evenings songs were arranged by Anohni, Nico Muhly and Rob Moose consisting of tracks spanning Anohni's four albums.

Critical reception

Stereogum placed Swanlights in its Top 50 Albums of the year at No. 8. Tiny Mix Tapes gave Swanlights a 4.5/5 saying that "yet another gorgeous creation by one of the most unique artists of the 2000s." Pitchforks review stated "Swanlights might be [Anohni]'s richest album yet, with musical and thematic charms that take their time to take their hold...."  Mojo scored Swanlights with 4 out of 5 stars saying, "Death, love, the ghosts they leave behind; these are grand themes, and Antony channels their spirit with magical grace."

In October 2010, Anohni was invited to "takeover" The Guardians music and arts page that ran for weeks leading up to the release of Swanlights. The takeover consisted of a slide show of Anohni's artwork with narration by Anohni of selections from the Swanlights book, a phone conversation between Anohni and Björk, an essay on the environment vs capitalism by Jerry Mander and several other articles dealing with song writing, Marina Abramović, videos and more.

Track listing

 All songs included on Hardcover Edition except "Flétta" by Anohni and Björk.

Charts

Weekly charts

Year-end charts

In 2011 it was awarded a gold certification from the Independent Music Companies Association which indicated sales of at least 75,000 copies throughout Europe.

References

Secretly Canadian albums
Antony and the Johnsons albums
2010 albums